Inquilaab is the word of Persian meaning, "revolution, change, turn, or uprising  (often used as a political slogan)

Inquilaab may refer to:

 Inquilaab (album), an album by Junoon
 Inquilaab (1984 film), a 1984 Bollywood Hindi film
 Inquilaab (2002 film), a 2002 Bengali film